Jacksons Fencing is a British fencing manufacturing company based in Stowting Common near Ashford in Kent.
The company has three locations across England: Ashford (Kent), Chester, and Bath. 

Company History 

Founded in 1947 by Harold Sands Jackson and his son Ian Jackson, originally selling chestnut stakes and agricultural fencing to local farmers. Over the next few years they built up the business, adding further lines and opening new locations in other parts of the country. In the 1960s Jacksons Fencing was one of the first to introduce pressure treatment for timber to help preserve and lengthen the life of their timber products.  

The 1970s saw the introduction of the company’s fencing brochure: The Good Fencing Guide, which showed both agricultural and residential customers the range of products. 

Steel fencing and gates were added to the company's portfolio in the 1980s and the range has since grown from metal railings to a wide range of security fencing, school fencing, playground fencing, and high security fencing, as well as manual and automated gates. Styles include vertical bar, bow top, ornamental, welded mesh, and unique vertical bar and mesh, and timber and steel combination panels. Following rigorous testing by BRE and LPCB, the company has a huge range of LPS 1175 certified fencing and gates which provide proven protection against attempts at forced entry with a range of tools.  

In 2004, the company started manufacturing timber acoustic barriers. The Jakoustic® range includes reflective and absorptive variants which are also available as UKCA marked complete systems, compliant with the requirements of BS EN 14388:2005 relating to traffic noise reducing devices. 

Jakoustic® Commercial and Highway can be supplied and installed in compliance with Highways Sector Scheme 2C for the supply, installation and repair of environmental barriers for infrastructure works and Scheme 4 for preservative treatment of timber. 

Jacksons Security division often attends exhibitions in London and Birmingham to showcase products and network with the security industry. 

Present day  

The company employs over 280 staff and is the UK’s leading premium quality timber and steel fencing and gate manufacturer. All their products are backed by an industry leading 25 year guarantee which showcases the company’s commitment to high quality, sustainable and long lasting products.

Jakcure® Timber Treatment
How the Jakcure process works

Timber Selection 

Timber selection is integral to providing our timber products with a long life. We only use a small range of specific species of softwood that we know have the correct physiology to achieve a successful and consistent penetration of our timber preservative through the timber sapwood and into the heartwood. This means the timber will hold our treatment effectively and therefore stay protected against rot and insect attack for 25 years and longer. 

Moisture Content & Kiln Drying 

All softwood is tested for moisture content - because excess moisture prevents absorption of the preservative. All timber with more than 28% moisture content is kiln dried. This drying process is essential to ensure deep penetration into the wood fibers. 

Vacuum Pressure Treatment 

Once the timber has the correct moisture content, we then force our preservative by vacuum/pressure right through the outside sap wood to the heartwood, where it forms an insoluble compound giving permanent protection against rot and insect attack.

Achievements
In April 2010, the company became the first to have a timber security fence system certified by Loss Prevention Certification Board (LPCB), when its Jakoustic Class 3 system was certified to LPS 1175 Security Rating 3 (SR3). It went onto develop security fencing systems in steel, timber and novel timber and steel combinations with LPCB LPS 1175 security ratings covering SR1 to SR5. LPCB LPS 1175 SR5 is the highest security rating attained by a fencing system and is held by Jacksons Trident 5 system.

In 2015 the company introduced the first Hedgehog Friendly Gravel Board to help the declining hedgehog population in the UK. The product helps hedgehogs go between gardens in search for food and mates.

In 2016 the company reported an increase in pre-tax profits following the win of the Eurotunnel contract to supply and install security fencing and gate upgrades around the terminal's perimeter in Coquelles, France.

In June 2017 The Sunday Times featured the organisation in their International Track 200 League Table for its involvement in the Eurotunnel project and projects in Russia.

In May 2018, the company announced its successful transition to the most up to date international quality management standard ISO 9001:2015, (a requirement for continued certification to LPCB LPS 1175 certification). Headed by Peter Jackson since October 2014, the company remains in private, family ownership and serves both consumers and businesses.

2021 Jacksons Fencing works alongside Essex Police and Secured by Design to showcase garden security 

2022 Jacksons Fencing work alongside Met Police at Ideal Homes Show to showcase home security

References 

Manufacturing companies of England
Companies based in Kent
Manufacturing companies established in 1947
1947 establishments in England